The Jewett Sand Formation is a geologic formation in California, USA. It preserves fossils dating back to the Miocene Epoch of the Neogene period.

Vertebrates

Cartilaginous fishes

Sharks

†Alopias exigua
†Alopias latidens
Alopias vulpinus†Carcharocles angustidens '''†Carcharodon hastalisCarcharhinus sp.Cephaloscyllium sp.Cetorhinus sp.Echinorhinus blakei†Galeocerdo medius†Galeorhinus latusHeterodontus sp.
Hexanchus sp.
†Megachasma applegatei 
†Megalolamna paradoxodon
†Negaprion elongata'''Odontaspis ferox†Parotodus benediniSphyrna sp.†Squalus serriculusSquatina lerichi

Rays and skates†Zapteryx californicus
Myliobatis californicus'''

Bony Fishes

Bothidae indet.
Embiotocidae indet.
Gadidae indet.
Pleuronectidae indet.
Sciaenidae indet.
Scorpaenidae indet.

Reptiles
Chelonia indet.
Crocodylia indet.
†Psephophorus calvertensis

Birds
†Plotopterum joaquinensis

Mammals

†Allodesmus kernensis
†Allodelphis pratti
†Anchitherium sp.
†Argyrocetus joaquinensis
†Argyrocetus bakersfieldensis†Desmathyus
†Enaliarctidae indet.
†Enaliarctos mealsi
†Macrodelphinus kelloggi
†Miodelphis californicusOtariidae indet.
Phocidae indet.
Pinnipedia indet.
†Pinnarctidion bishopi†Squalodontidae indet.

Invertebrates
BivalvesAequipecten andersoni Arca montareyannaChione temblorensisClementia pertenuisCrassostrea titanCrenomytilus mathewsoniCytheria matthewsoniDosinia conradiDosinia whitneyiGlycymeris septentrionalisHomomya sp.Mactromeris albariaMytilus sp.Nodipecten estrellanusPecten bowersiPecten magnoliaPecten nevadaensisPecten perriniPecten sespeensisPectunculus branneriPhacoides actulineatusPinna alamedaensisPycnodonte eldridgeiSolen sp.Tellina ocoyanaTellina sp.Trachycardium vaquerosensisGastropodsAgasoma gravidumAgasoma kerrianumConus oweniCrepidula princepsEpitonium rugiferumNatica lewisiNeverita callosaPurpura limaScaphopodsDentalium sp.''

References

See also

 List of fossiliferous stratigraphic units in California
 Paleontology in California

Geologic formations of California
Neogene stratigraphic units of North America